Mahinda I (or Midel) was King of Anuradhapura in the 8th century, whose reign lasted from 738 to 741. He succeeded his brother Kassapa III as King of Anuradhapura and was succeeded by his nephew Aggabodhi VI.

He was a sentimental person who refused to wear the crown due to his grief on the death of his old friend, Nila. Nila had died only a short time before the coronation. King Mahinda duly discharged his kingly duties but gave up pleasures of the kingly office.

His first and foremost duty was to protect the people of Sri Lanka and he governed under the title of Adipada (Governor). He raised prince Aggabodhi (the son of his brother Kassapa III) to the office of Yuva Raja (Sub-King) . The Yuva Raja was entrusted with the administration of the eastern part of the country. His own son was entrusted with the administration of Ruhuna (Rohana District).

He caused to give 10 cartloads of alms at Mahapali Dana Sala (Alms Hall). He built a vihara (temple) and a Meheni Aramaya (Convent for Bhikkunis) and endowed it with the income of two villages.

He died in the third year of his reign. His nephew, Yuva Raja prince Aggabodhi, was in the capital at the time of his death and succeeded Mahinda as King  Aggabodhi VI.

See also
 List of Sri Lankan monarchs
 History of Sri Lanka

References

External links
 Kings & Rulers of Sri Lanka
 Codrington's Short History of Ceylon

Monarchs of Anuradhapura
Sinhalese kings
House of Lambakanna II
8th-century Sinhalese monarchs